The Bayer designations h Carinae and H Carinae are distinct.

for h Carinae, see HD 83183
for H Carinae, see HD 83095

Carinae, h
Carina (constellation)